Pope Pius I was the bishop of Rome from  140 to his death  154, according to the Annuario Pontificio. His dates are listed as 142 or 146 to 157 or 161, respectively. He is considered to have opposed both the Valentinians and Gnostics during his papacy. He is considered a saint by the Catholic Church and the Eastern Orthodox Church with a feast day in 11 July, but it is unclear if he died as a martyr.

In 1862, Mariano Rodríguez de Olmedo, bishop of San Juan, Puerto Rico, attempted to bring the remains of Pius to the Cathedral of San Juan Bautista after these were gifted to him by Pope Pius IX during Rodríguez Olmedo’s visit to the Vatican City. They were finally exported to the cathedral from Madrid, Spain in 1933. The remains are coated in wax skin and are kept in a glass structure in the church, which is the second oldest in the Americas, and Pius persists as the only pope whose remains are kept outside of Europe.

Early life
Pius is believed to have been born at Aquileia, in Northern Italy, during the late 1st century. His father was an Italian called "Rufinus", who was also a native of Aquileia according to the Liber Pontificalis. According to the 2nd-century Muratorian Canon and the Liberian Catalogue, that he was the brother of Hermas, author of the text known as The Shepherd of Hermas. The writer of the later text identifies himself as a former slave. This has led to speculation that both Hermas and Pius were freedmen. However Hermas' statement that he was a slave may just mean that he belonged to a low-ranking plebeian family.

Pontificate
According to Catholic tradition, Pius I governed the church in the middle of the 2nd century during the reigns of the Emperors Antoninus Pius and Marcus Aurelius. He is held to be the ninth successor of Saint Peter, who decreed that Easter should only be kept on a Sunday. Although credited with ordering the publication of the Liber Pontificalis, compilation of that document was not started before the beginning of the 6th century. He is also said to have built one of the oldest churches in Rome, Santa Pudenziana.

Justin Martyr taught Christian doctrine in Rome during the pontificate of Pius I but the account of his martyrdom does not name him, an unsurprising occurrence, considering the brevity of the account. The heretics Valentinus, Cerdon, and Marcion visited Rome during that period. Catholic apologists see this as an argument for the primacy of the Roman See during the 2nd century. Pope Pius I is believed to have opposed the Valentinians and Gnostics under Marcion, whom he excommunicated.

There is some conjecture that Pius was a martyr in Rome, a conjecture that entered earlier editions of the Roman Breviary. The study that had produced the 1969 revision of the General Roman Calendar stated that there were no grounds for his consideration as a martyr, and he is not presented as such in the Roman Martyrology.

Feast day
Pius I's feast day is 11 July. In the Tridentine Calendar it was given the rank of "Simple" and celebrated as the feast of a martyr. The rank of the feast was reduced to a Commemoration in the 1955 General Roman Calendar of Pope Pius XII and the General Roman Calendar of 1960. Though no longer mentioned in the General Roman Calendar, Saint Pius I may now, according to the rules in the present-day Roman Missal, be celebrated everywhere on his feast day as a Memorial, unless in some locality an obligatory celebration is assigned to that day.

See also

List of Catholic saints
List of popes

References

1st-century births
154 deaths
2nd-century archbishops
2nd-century Christian martyrs
2nd-century Romans
Christian slaves and freedmen
Italian popes
Papal saints
People from Aquileia
Popes
Year of birth unknown
2nd-century popes
Imperial Roman slaves and freedmen
Burials at St. Peter's Basilica
Christian anti-Gnosticism